Major-General Sir John Swinton of Kimmerghame,  (21 April 1925 – 4 October 2018) was a British Army officer who served as Major-General commanding the Household Division and General Officer Commanding London District from 1976 until his retirement in 1979. He was the father of actress Tilda Swinton.

Early life
Swinton was the son of Brigadier Alan Henry Campbell Swinton of Kimmerghame, MC (born 15 March 1896) and wife, Mariora Beatrice Evelyn Rochfort Alers-Hankey (born 1900). A member of the Swinton family, his paternal grandfather was Scottish politician and officer-of-arms George Swinton. He was educated at Harrow School, London.

Military career
Swinton was commissioned into the Scots Guards on 24 March 1944, and was twice wounded towards the end of the Second World War. He was promoted to lieutenant on 8 November 1947. He served in Malaya during the Indonesia–Malaysia confrontation and was mentioned in despatches. Swinton was promoted to captain on 21 April 1952. Between 1953 and 1954, he was aide-de-camp to Field-Marshal Sir William Slim, governor-general of Australia.

He was successively promoted to major on 21 April 1959, to lieutenant-colonel on 1 April 1966, commanding the Scots Guards (1970–71), to full colonel on 30 June 1970, and to brigadier on 31 December 1971. He was promoted to major-general and appointed Major-General commanding the Household Division and General Officer Commanding London District in 1976. In 1977, he was appointed Brigadier of the Queen's Body Guard for Scotland (The Royal Company of Archers). He retired from the Army in 1979.

In 1980, he became a deputy lieutenant for Berwickshire: he went on to be Lord Lieutenant of Berwickshire from 1989 to 2000 and escorted the Stone of Scone back to Scotland in 1996.

Personal life
He married the Australian-born Judith Balfour Killen (1929–2012) on 26 August 1954; they had three sons – James Christopher Swinton, Alexander Harold Swinton, and Lieutenant Colonel William Henry Swinton – and one daughter, actress Tilda Swinton.

As the laird of Kimmerghame, Swinton lived at Kimmerghame House in Duns in Berwickshire. He died there on 4 October 2018 at the age of 93.

References

 

1925 births
2018 deaths
People educated at Harrow School
British Army generals
British Army personnel of the Indonesia–Malaysia confrontation
Knights Commander of the Royal Victorian Order
Officers of the Order of the British Empire
Scots Guards officers
British Army personnel of World War II